Mesnilotrix is a genus of bristle flies in the family Tachinidae. There is one described species in Mesnilotrix, M. empiformis.

Distribution
Madagascar

References

Dexiinae
Diptera of Africa
Tachinidae genera
Monotypic Brachycera genera